Christine Böhm (February 19, 1954 – August 5, 1979) was an Austrian actress. She performed in many comedies and appeared on Arsen Lupin, a 1970s television series. She died in an accident at age 25.

Biography 
Böhm was born on February 19, 1954, in Vienna, Austria. Her father was Maxi Böhm, an Austrian performer.

She performed in comedies which were broadcast by the Austrian Television ORF and appeared on the Arsen Lupin show (primarily known as Arsène Lupin in its home French market).

On August 5, 1979, Böhm died in an accident in Cerro di Laveno, Lake Maggiore, Italy.

Selected filmography
 Bloody Friday (1972)
 Stolen Heaven (1974)
  (1976)
  (1977)
 Lady Oscar (1979)

References

External links 
 

1954 births
1979 deaths
Actresses from Vienna